= Hamdi (poet) =

Kurdish poet

Hamd
- Ahmed Beg Fatah Beg Ibrahim Beg Mahmud Beg
- Born: 1876; Sulaymaniyah, Ottoman Empire
- Died: 12 November 1936 (aged 59–60); Sulaymaniyah, Iraq
- Occupation: Poet

Ahmed Beg Fatah Beg Ibrahim Beg Mahmud Beg or Hamdi (حەمدی in Kurdish), (1876–1936), was a Kurdish poet.
